The 1988 Jacksonville State Gamecocks football team represented Jacksonville State University as a member of the Gulf South Conference (GSC) during the 1988 NCAA Division II football season.

Schedule

References

Jacksonville State
Jacksonville State Gamecocks football seasons
Gulf South Conference football champion seasons
Jacksonville State Gamecocks football